Grugliasco is a comune (municipality) in the Metropolitan City of Turin in the Italian region of Piedmont, located about  west of Turin.

Grugliasco borders the municipalities of Turin, Collegno, and Rivoli. In 1945 here and in Collegno members of the retreating German 34th Infantry Division and 5th Mountain Division killed 68 civilians in retaliation for a partisan ambush.

International relations

Grugliasco is twinned with:
 
 Roman, Romania
 Barberà del Vallès, Spain
 Echirolles, France
 Gourcy, Burkina Faso
 San Gregorio Magno, Italy

Transport

References

External links

 Official website